Ana Isabel García Llorente (11 May 1991 – 2 March 2017), known as Gata Cattana and Ana Sforza, was a Spanish rapper, poet and feminist.

In her career she managed to combine hip hop and electronic music with various themes and styles such as feminism and politics. Her lyrics referenced to Andalusian culture, to the mythological topoi of the ancient age – especially Greek, Roman and ancient Egyptian literature – as well as poetry, philosophy and mass culture; her recurring themes included introspection, dialectical materialism, political andalusism, anti-globalization, existentialism and socialist feminism.

She died in the wake of an anaphylactic shock in 2017.

A documentary film about her life and work, Eterna, premiered in 2022.

Discography

Studio albums 
 Inéditos 2015 (2016)
 Banzai (2017)

Extended plays 
 Los siete contra Tebas (2012)
 Anclas (2015)

Singles 
 "Samsara" (2016)
 "Banzai" (2017)
 "Hermano inventor" (2017)

Bibliography 
 
 
  (New edition with extra content)

References

Singers from Andalusia
People from the Province of Córdoba (Spain)
Spanish women poets
Spanish women rappers
Spanish feminists
21st-century Spanish singers
21st-century Spanish poets
1991 births
2017 deaths
21st-century Spanish women singers